Anke Behmer ( Vater, born 5 June 1961) is a former East German athlete who competed mainly in the heptathlon.

She won the bronze medal for East Germany at the 1988 Summer Olympics held in Seoul, South Korea with a personal best score of 6858 points. This result ranks her fourth among German heptathletes, behind Sabine Braun, Sabine Paetz and Ramona Neubert.

References

External links
 
 
 
 

1961 births
Living people
East German heptathletes
Olympic athletes of East Germany
Olympic bronze medalists for East Germany
Olympic bronze medalists in athletics (track and field)
Athletes (track and field) at the 1988 Summer Olympics
Medalists at the 1988 Summer Olympics
World Athletics Championships athletes for East Germany
World Athletics Championships medalists
European Athletics Championships medalists
Recipients of the Patriotic Order of Merit in silver
People from Mecklenburgische Seenplatte (district)
People from Bezirk Neubrandenburg
People of the Stasi
Sportspeople from Mecklenburg-Western Pomerania